Corybantes mathani is a moth in the Castniidae family. It is found in South America, including Venezuela, Guyana and Peru.

The wingspan is 110–115 mm. Adults are light brown with a greenish hue. The forewing is crossed by a sinuous greyish band at the discal area. The band runs from the costal margin to the inner angle without touching it. There are also two whitish spots found near the costal margin and a yellowish, smaller spot. The hindwings are light brown with a greenish hue towards the base and anal margin. Here, two rows of yellowish spots with reddish borders are found that run parallel to the external margin.

Subspecies
Corybantes mathani mathani (Amazonas)
Corybantes mathani atrata (Röber, 1931) (Peru)

References

Moths described in 1881
Castniidae